Otford railway station is located on the South Coast railway line in New South Wales, Australia. It serves the village of Otford opening on 3 October 1888. Two refuge sidings existed north of the station until removed in the 1980s.

Platforms & services
Otford has two side platforms and is serviced by NSW TrainLink South Coast line services travelling between Waterfall and Port Kembla. Some peak hour and late night services operate to Sydney Central, Bondi Junction and Kiama.

References

External links

Otford station details Transport for New South Wales

Railway stations in Australia opened in 1888
Regional railway stations in New South Wales